Daphne Mainomene, also called Nymphaeum or Nymphaion, was a coastal town of ancient Bithynia located on the Bosphorus.

Its site is tentatively located near Umur yeri in Asiatic Turkey.

References

Populated places in Bithynia
Former populated places in Turkey
History of Istanbul Province